Reinhard Rychly (born 7 November 1951) is a German former gymnast. He competed at the 1972 Summer Olympics in all artistic gymnastics events and won a bronze medal with the East German team. Individually his best achievement was 15th place on the horizontal bar.

References

1951 births
Living people
German male artistic gymnasts
Olympic gymnasts of East Germany
Gymnasts at the 1972 Summer Olympics
Olympic bronze medalists for East Germany
Olympic medalists in gymnastics
Sportspeople from Rostock
Medalists at the 1972 Summer Olympics